Lambert's Bay is a small fishing town in the Western Cape province of South Africa situated  north of Cape Town. It is part of the Cederberg Municipality.

The coast town has been proclaimed 'the Diamond of the West Coast' because of its white beaches, wildlife and lobsters. Although primarily a fishing town, it has become a significant tourist attraction on the West Coast due to its moderate all-year climate.

Birding 
 Bird Island Nature Reserve – The nesting and breeding ground of thousands of Cape gannets, penguins and other bird species can be reached by walking on a breakwater wall.

History
Lambert's Bay is named after Admiral Lambert of the British Navy who did a marine survey of the bay between 1826 and 1840.

In 1887 Mr Stephan bought the commercial buildings and built the hotel in 1888. Lambert's Bay was used as a lay-up for British warships during the war of 1900–1902 and in 1901 HMS Sybille was wrecked opposite Steenbokfontein.

The first crayfish factory was started by Mr Lindström in 1918.

See also
 Mussel Point, a prehistoric shell midden near Lamberts Bay

References

Populated places in the Cederberg Local Municipality